Arispe ovalis is a species of snout moth in the genus Arispe. It was described by Ragonot, in 1891. It is found in Mexico.

References

Moths described in 1891
Pyralini
Moths of Central America
Taxa named by Émile Louis Ragonot